Hugh Baring (17 August 1906 – 9 July 1968) was an Australian cricketer. He played two first-class cricket matches for Victoria between 1929 and 1930.

See also
 List of Victoria first-class cricketers

References

External links
 

1906 births
1968 deaths
Australian cricketers
Victoria cricketers
Cricketers from Melbourne